Dätgen is a small village in the district of Rendsburg-Eckernförde, located in the center of Schleswig-Holstein, Germany.

References

Municipalities in Schleswig-Holstein
Rendsburg-Eckernförde